John Nicholas Tartaglia (born February 16, 1978) is an American actor, singer, and puppeteer.

Early life
Tartaglia was born in Maple Shade Township, New Jersey, and graduated from Upper Dublin High School in Fort Washington, Pennsylvania, in 1996.

Tartaglia joined Sesame Streets puppetry team in a part-time capacity at the age of 16, making him one of the youngest Sesame Street puppeteers in the show's history. He performed as a right hand and many minor characters, including Phoebe, and was the understudy for Kevin Clash's Elmo. He performed as Ernie for the second season of Play with Me Sesame and as Oscar the Grouch for Sesame Street 4D. He became a full-time part of Sesame Street at the age of 18.

Personal life
Tartaglia is openly gay. Regarding the matter, he has stated "I'm less worried about being a positive role model as a gay person than making sure there are no negative stereotypes of any sort." He considers "nothing more addictive than the sound of an audience laughing" and, regarding the possibility of being "pigeonholed" as a children's entertainer, stated, "If I get pigeonholed, I get pigeonholed. When I do my dark, one-hour miniseries on Lifetime, you'll know!" In 2004, he helped to raise $525,000 for Broadway Cares/Equity Fights AIDS.

Tartaglia married Michael Shawn Lewis in New York in 2012.

Career
In 2003, he performed DJ 2 in Animal Jam.

Tartaglia created and puppeteered the roles of Princeton (the recent college grad) and Rod (the closeted Republican investment banker) in the Tony Award-winning Broadway musical Avenue Q, which opened July 31, 2003. For the roles, he was nominated for the Tony Award for Best Actor in a Musical in 2004. He left the cast on January 30, 2005.

Tartaglia appeared in 2004 at the 14th annual Broadway Bares, which raised $525,000 to benefit Broadway Cares/Equity Fights AIDS.

Tartaglia reprised his roles as Princeton and Rod in the Las Vegas sit-down production of Avenue Q, starting in August 2005
until December 11, 2005. He then appeared in the musical Newsical 2006: The Next Edition in New York City, in a limited engagement in December 2005.

Tartaglia joined the cast of Beauty and the Beast as Lumière on November 21, 2006, until early June 2007.

He appeared in his own television series for Playhouse Disney called Johnny and the Sprites as creator, executive producer, and star. While the episodes began as only 5-minute interstitials, the show began a full 30-minute series on January 13, 2007. The show began filming Season 2 during mid-2007.

In 2007, Tartaglia provided the voice for Mr. Bluelight in Kmart commercials.

He played the roles of Pinocchio, Puss in Boots, and the Magic Mirror and puppeteered the dragon in Shrek The Musical. After a try-out in Seattle, the show opened on Broadway at The Broadway Theatre on December 14, 2008. Tartaglia performed in the show until August 16, 2009, and was replaced by Robb Sapp. He returned on December 14, 2009, and stayed until the production closed on January 3, 2010.

Tartaglia created and wrote John Tartaglia's ImaginOcean which was produced Off-Broadway at New World Stages, running from March 31, 2010, to September 4, 2011. The show has music and lyrics by William Wade, with puppets designed and built by The Puppet Kitchen and the set design by Robert Kovach. ImaginOcean is a puppet show about fish intended for audiences between the ages of 2 and 8. The puppets glow in the dark while the actors are in black, giving the effect that the puppets are floating. The show was nominated for the 2010 Drama Desk Award for Unique Theatrical Experience.

Tartaglia performed in Los Angeles in the Blank Theatre Company production of The Temperamentals, running from April 9 to May 22, 2011, at the 2nd Stage Theatre.

He played Genie in the production of Aladdin in St. Louis at The Muny from July 5–13, 2012.

In 2011, Tartaglia was named a "Givenik Ambassador" by the Broadway/charity site Givenik.

Tartaglia hosts a radio show on Sirius XM On Broadway called Sunday Funday with John Tartaglia.

In 2016, he created the series Splash and Bubbles for PBS Kids, in which he voices Splash and other recurring characters.

In 2017, he performed Hank in Julie's Greenroom.

Filmography

Film
 Elmopalooza - Additional Puppeteer
 Love the Hard Way - Jack (uncredited)
 Antwone Fisher - Dancer (uncredited)
 Honey 2 - Ballet Dancer
 The Women in Black - Jewelry Salesman (uncredited)
 The Happytime Murders - Additional Voices

Television
 Animal Jam - DJ 2
 Bear in the Big Blue House - Additional Puppeteer
 Between the Lions - guest Sesame Street puppeteer (Elmo/Bert "Dance with Smartypants" segments)
 Dog City - Additional Puppeteer
 Play with Me Sesame - Ernie (Season 2)
 Fraggle Rock: Rock On! - Gobo Fraggle (taking over from Jerry Nelson); Boober Fraggle, Uncle Traveling Matt, and Wembley Fraggle (puppetry only)
 Julie's Greenroom - Hank
 Elmo's World: Computer Graphic Puppeteer
 Johnny and the Sprites: Johnny, Sage
 Sesame English: Tingo
 Sesame Street: Alfred Duck, Phoebe (2002), The Great Quackini, Trey, Cookie Monster's Mommy (2004), Brandeis, Safety Chicken, Yip-Yip Martian, Various
 Splash and Bubbles: Splash, Various
 Word Party: Kip the Wallaby (voice)
 The Wubbulous World of Dr. Seuss: Bird, Delivery Man

Stage

References

External links
 
 
 John Tartaglia & Michael Shawn Lewis's production company, Gable Grove Productions
 John Tartaglia talks with Craft Ideas Weekly about how he started making puppets
 Stephanie D'Abruzzo and John Tartaglia - Downstage Center interview at American Theatre Wing.org

1978 births
21st-century American comedians
American puppeteers
American male singers
American male voice actors
American male comedians
American male film actors
American male television actors
American male musical theatre actors
American gay actors
Living people
People from Maple Shade Township, New Jersey
Sesame Street Muppeteers
Theatre World Award winners
Muppet performers